Tony Banham is founder of the Hong Kong War Diary project, which studies and documents the 1941 defence of Hong Kong, the defenders, their families, and the fates of all until liberation. His published books:

 “Not The Slightest Chance” (Hong Kong University Press, 2003) 
 “The Sinking of the Lisbon Maru” (Hong Kong University Press, 2006) 
 “We Shall Suffer There” (Hong Kong University Press, 2009) 
 “Reduced to a Symbolical Scale” (Hong Kong University Press, 2017) 

Are considered to be examples of some of the best research on the Hong Kong experience during the Second World War. Mr. Banham is also very active in the "human side" of historical research relating to the era and often speaks at various symposia on the subject and carries on an active dialogue with survivors of the conflict and their families. He also maintains a close association with various diplomatic services, government agencies, and other official parties associated with providing care and services to those involved in the conflict. He serves, at the request on the Government of the Hong Kong SAR, on a special government panel which reviews and grants the payment of pensions to veterans ( or their survivors ) who served Hong Kong during the period. He is also Honorary Editor of the Journal of The Royal Asiatic Society Hong Kong, and principal of Reyner Banham Consulting.

Private life 

Banham was born into an academic family in Norfolk. He is nephew of architectural historian Professor Reyner Banham (1922-1988) and great nephew of 1945-1964 Member of Parliament Edwin Gooch (1889-1964)
He graduated in Computer Science at the University of Hertfordshire and had an initial career in research & development with Royal Dutch Shell and the European Space Agency at ESRIN. At the age of 30 he moved to Hong Kong, working there for a variety of software vendors including Informix, and was for many years a senior executive based in Hong Kong with Oracle, reporting finally to that corporation's Chairman and Founder, Larry Ellison. He is a licensed pilot and is married with two sons and has made Hong Kong his permanent home. Today he is principal and founder of Reyner Banham Consulting, a boutique agency specialising in historical PR consulting.

Hong Kong War Diary

Hong Kong War Diary began as a simple attempt to locate and centralise documentation relating to Hong Kong's wartime garrison, but soon evolved into the core of a community of interest around this group of people. What started off as purely a centre of information exchange, grew into a historical network that helps today's descendants of the defenders place their ancestors' experiences in context, offers a service to other researchers, and reunites families split by war. His website has more than 10,000 regular readers and he is generally acknowledged as the authority on Hong Kong's POWs. The central ethos of the project has been to catalyze the open exchange of all information from disparate sources for the benefit of the maximum number of people.

Banham's core interest is in the impact of war on society at both the micro and macro level. This interest runs the gamut from studying the civilian casualties in the London blitz to writing about the concept of the island of Tinian (where Banham has conducted on-site research) being, as the location where the final assembly of "Little Boy" and "Fat Man" took place, the geographical segue between the 'old war' (of tanks and marines storming beaches) to the 'new war' which has dominated civilization since Hiroshima. Hong Kong, while perhaps not the central theatre of the conflict, offered an opportunity to study a small population in the context of the critical path to victory that dominated the core of the Pacific War.

Banham received his PhD in history from the Australian Defence Force Academy (ADFA), Canberra. The book Reduced to a Symbolical Scale is closely based on his thesis.

Published work

Banham's books – spin offs from Hong Kong War Diary – avoid the traditional historian's analyses. Instead, they set out to construct the most accurate possible chronology of the events concerned, populated almost entirely with the words of the people who experienced them.
In "Not The Slightest Chance", a reference book laid out as a war diary, Banham documents the attempted defence of Hong Kong against Japanese invasion. "The Sinking of the Lisbon Maru" takes up the story of those defenders taken prisoner afterwards, who were then put on this vessel to be taken to POW Camps in Japan. "We Shall Suffer There" documents the remainder of the POW and Internee experience. His latest work, "Reduced to a Symbolical Scale", documents the civilian evacuation of the then Colony in 1940 and the men they left behind. A future volume will cover the secret war for Hong Kong (the escapees and invaders, and the irregular forces that many joined).
Banham has also contributed to a large number of other books and publications, including the history of the HKVDC: 'Serving Hong Kong', and is a contributor to Hong Kong's new Dictionary of National Biography. Mr Banham's works are produced to the highest standards of historical and academic accuracy and have been widely read by both academic historians and members of the general public. However the narrow audience for the books limit the scope of sales and each work has been a "labor of love" as opposed to a financial bonanza for the author.

Banham has also appeared on or assisted with documentaries for TVB Pearl (Hong Kong), ATV (Hong Kong), RTHK Radio (Hong Kong), Phoenix TV (China), the BBC (UK), the History Channel (US), Breakthrough Films (Canada) and others. Most recently he featured on Channel 4 in My Grandfather's War with Sir Mark Rylance.

The Big For

Banham's first novel, "The Big For", was designed to interest younger people in British history and was originally written as light relief while finalising his PhD thesis.

Bibliography

References

External links 
 Hong Kong War Diary Website
 Reyner Banham Consulting Website
 Royal Asiatic Society Hong Kong Branch Website
 The Big For novel

1959 births
Living people
People from South Norfolk (district)
Alumni of the University of Hertfordshire
British historians
British military writers
Historians of World War II
British military historians